Home Moravian Church is a Moravian church located in Winston-Salem, North Carolina. The church was founded on November 13, 1771.

Located in Old Salem, the church is visited by tourists and historians. It conducts weekly services.

References

Further reading
 
 
 
 
 
 

Churches in Winston-Salem, North Carolina
1771 establishments in North Carolina
Moravian churches in North Carolina
Churches completed in 1771